Jean-Marc Richard (born October 8, 1966) is a Canadian former professional ice hockey defenceman who played five games in the National Hockey League for the Quebec Nordiques. As a youth, he played in the 1978 and 1979 Quebec International Pee-Wee Hockey Tournaments with a minor ice hockey team based in Pont-Rouge.

Career statistics

References

External links

1966 births
Living people
Canadian ice hockey defencemen
Chicoutimi Saguenéens (QMJHL) players
Fort Wayne Komets players
Frankfurt Lions players
Fredericton Express players
French Quebecers
Halifax Citadels players
Ice hockey people from Quebec
Las Vegas Thunder players
People from Saint-Raymond, Quebec
Quebec Nordiques players
Quebec Rafales players
San Diego Gulls (IHL) players
Undrafted National Hockey League players